Sadik Fofana (born 16 May 2003) is a German footballer  who plays as a defender for 2. Bundesliga club 1. FC Nürnberg, on loan from Bayer Leverkusen. Born in Germany, he has been called up to represent Togo as a youth international.

Career

Club career

Fofana started his career with German Bundesliga side Bayer Leverkusen. In 2022, he was sent on loan to 1. FC Nürnberg in the German second tier. On 24 July 2022, Fofana debuted for 1. FC Nürnberg during a 2−0 win over Greuther Fürth.

International career

Born in Germany, Fofana is of Togolese descent. He was called up to the Germany U20s in September 2022.

References

External links
 
 
 Bundesliga profile

Living people
2003 births
Sportspeople from Aachen
German footballers
Germany youth international footballers
German people of Togolese descent
Association football defenders
Association football midfielders
Bayer 04 Leverkusen players
1. FC Nürnberg players
2. Bundesliga players